Cary station is an active train station located in Cary, North Carolina. Service from the Cary Station is to Charlotte, Miami, New York, and points in between.

History 
The railroad came to Cary in 1854 with the arrival of the North Carolina Railroad. This is the northernmost track in Cary today, and it was originally built mostly by enslaved people. A second line for the Chatham Railroad was completed in 1868, creating a railroad crossing in Cary. Regular passenger service to Cary started in 1867. The Chatham Railroad constructed a passenger waiting room and warehouse in Cary by 1871. By the early 20th century, Cary residents used both railroads for daily trips to Raleigh for shopping. However, during the Great Depression, rail service was discontinued. 

Cary's historic station was demolished in about 1976. It had served the Southern Railway and the Seaboard Air Line. When Amtrak passenger service to Cary resumed in 1995, there was no longer a depot. This initial Amtrak service was an infill station on the Piedmont, a state-owned regional railroad operated by Amtrak and mostly financed by the North Carolina Department of Transportation.

Current station 
In 1996, the North Carolina Department of Transportation Rail Division erected a platform and shelter for the H Line, north of the station, at the cost of $100,000. This was just prior to the opening of the new Cary Station which cost $737,000—$637,000 from the town and $100,000 from the Triangle Transit Authority. The state-subsidized Carolinian, began serving the station in 1997, in addition to the Piedmont.

In 2006, the North Carolina Department of Transportation constructed a platform on the S Line, south of the station, which allowed the Silver Star (New York-Tampa-Miami) to begin service to Cary. The town contributed $30,000 or 10% of the project's cost.

The station was expanded at the cost of $2 million in NCDOT and Federal Railroad Administration funds in 2010 and 2011. The station reopened on September 1, 2011, and featured a larger waiting room, restrooms, and a staffed ticket sales window with checked baggage service.

The Cary station has about 130 free parking spaces.

Awards 
In Amtrak's 2017 customer satisfaction survey, the Cary Station ranked #1 in "overall experience," beating more than 450 stations for the honor. Amtrak customers reviewed stations based on cleanliness, ease of boarding, safety, signage, and staff friendliness.

References

External links 

Cary Station – NC By Train

Amtrak stations in North Carolina
Buildings and structures in Cary, North Carolina
Railway stations in the United States opened in 1996
Transportation in Wake County, North Carolina